Alec Bartlett (born April 27, 1993) is an American soccer player.

Career

College and amateur
Bartlett began playing college soccer at Creighton University in 2011, but never made an appearance with the University. He transferred to Drake University in 2012 and played with the University until 2015.

While at college, Bartlett also appeared for USL PDL club Des Moines Menace from 2013 to 2015.

Professional
Bartlett signed with United Soccer League side Charlotte Independence on March 23, 2016.

References

1993 births
Living people
American soccer players
Creighton Bluejays men's soccer players
Drake Bulldogs men's soccer players
Des Moines Menace players
Charlotte Independence players
Soccer players from Kansas
USL League Two players
USL Championship players
Sportspeople from Overland Park, Kansas
Association football defenders